Diaphorolepis wagneri, the  Ecuador frog-eating snake, is a species of snake in the family Colubridae. The species is native to Panama, Ecuador, and Colombia.

References

Diaphorolepis
Snakes of South America
Reptiles described in 1863
Reptiles of Panama
Reptiles of Ecuador
Reptiles of Colombia
Taxa named by Giorgio Jan